The women's discus throw at the 2017 World Championships in Athletics was held at the Olympic Stadium on 11 and 13 August.

Records
Before the competition records were as follows:

The following records were set at the competition:

Qualification standard
The standard to qualify automatically for entry was 61.20 metres.

Schedule
The event schedule, in local time (UTC+1), is as follows:

Results

Qualification
The qualification round took place on 11 August, in two groups, with Group A starting at 10:11 and Group B at 11:36. Athletes attaining a mark of at least 62.50 metres ( Q ) or at least the 12 best performers ( q ) qualified for the final. The overall results were as follows:

Final
The final took place on 13 August at 20:25. The overall results were as follows:

References

Discus throw
Discus throw at the World Athletics Championships